Vârteju may refer to several villages in Romania:

 Vârteju, a village in Lopătari Commune, Buzău County
 Vârteju, a village in the town of Măgurele, Ilfov County